Petrophile biternata is a species of flowering plant in the family Proteaceae and is endemic to southwestern Western Australia. It is a shrub with biternate or pinnate, sharply-pointed leaves, and oval or spherical heads of glabrous, sticky, yellow flowers.

Description

Taxonomy
Petrophile biternata was first formally described in 1855 by Carl Meissner in Hooker's Journal of Botany and Kew Garden Miscellany from material collected by James Drummond between the Moore and Murchison Rivers. The specific epithet (biternata) refers to the leaves.

Distribution and habitat
This petrophile grows in shrubland and heath in scattered populations in the Moora-Watheroo areas and near New Norcia, in southwestern Western Australia.

Conservation status
Petrophile biternata is classified as "Priority Three" by the Government of Western Australia Department of Parks and Wildlife meaning that it is poorly known and known from only a few locations but is not under imminent threat.

References

biternata
Eudicots of Western Australia
Endemic flora of Western Australia
Plants described in 1855
Taxa named by Carl Meissner